A list of books and essays about Federico Fellini:

Individual films
8 1/2

References

Fellini
 
Bibliography